Unionville is an unincorporated community in Union Grove Township, Whiteside County, Illinois, United States.

References 

Unincorporated communities in Whiteside County, Illinois
Unincorporated communities in Illinois